National Chung Hsing University (NCHU) is a research-led comprehensive university in South District, Taichung, Republic of China.

Currently, NCHU is among the four universities of the Taiwan Comprehensive University System, a research-led university alliance in Taiwan.

History
The university was originally founded as Advanced Academy of Agronomy and Forestry in Tainan in 1919. In 1928, the academy became a department affiliated to Taihoku Imperial University. In 1943, the department became an independent entity again and moved to Taichung. After the handover of Taiwan from Japan to the Republic of China in 1945, the school was reorganized and became Taichung Agricultural Junior College. In 1946, it was upgraded to Taichung College of Agriculture. In 1961, it merged with the newly established College of Science and Engineering and College of Law and Business and became Chung Hsing University. In 1971, it became a national university and was named National Chung Hsing University.

Campus
The Taichung Campus contains the College of Liberal Arts, the College of Agriculture and Natural Resources, the College of Science, the College of Engineering, the College of Life Sciences, the College of Veterinary Medicine, the College of Social Sciences and Management, and the Extension Division for Inservice and Continuing Education. It is located in the south of Taichung City with an area of approximately 53 hectares. 
The university owns four experimental forests located in New Taipei City, Nantou County, Taichung City, and Tainan City, respectively. It also owns two experimental farms located at Wufeng and Wuri Districts in Taichung City.

Organization 
NCHU has 9 colleges: Agriculture and Natural Resources, Electrical Engineering and Computer Science, Engineering, Law and Politics, Liberal Arts, Life Sciences, Management, Science, and Veterinary Medicine.

International programs
NCHU participates in the Taiwan International Graduate Program in Molecular and Biological Agricultural Sciences of Academia Sinica, Taiwan's most preeminent academic research institution.

Official Journal
Department of History: Chung-Hsing Journal of History
Graduate School of History: Chung-Hsing Historiography

Academics

Admissions and rankings

Notable alumni
 Chen Chih-ching, Minister of Council of Agriculture (2016)
 Chen Ter-shing, Vice Minister of Science and Technology (2014–2017)
 Cho Jung-tai, Chairperson of Democratic Progressive Party
 Ding Kung-wha, Chairperson of Financial Supervisory Commission (2016)
 Hochen Tan, Minister of Transportation and Communications (2016–2018)
 Ho Min-hao, member of Legislative Yuan (2002–2008)
 Hsieh Ming-yuan, member of Legislative Yuan (2002–2008)
 Kao Fu-yao, Deputy Minister of Public Construction Commission
 Lee Chin-yung, Magistrate of Yunlin County (2014–2018)
 Lee Li-chen, Deputy Minister of Mainland Affairs Council
 Lee Shying-jow, Minister of Veterans Affairs Council (2016–2018)
 Peng Tso-kwei, Minister of Council of Agriculture (1997–1999)
 Su Chun-jung, Deputy Minister of Directorate-General of Personnel Administration
 Su Jain-rong, Minister of Finance
 Sung Yu-hsieh, Deputy Secretary-General of Executive Yuan
 Tsai Chi-chang, Vice President of Legislative Yuan
 Tsai Jeong-duen, Vice President of Judicial Yuan
 Uliw Qaljupayare, member of Legislative Yuan (2008–2017)
 Wang Chung-yi, Minister of Coast Guard Administration (2014–2016)

See also
Taiwan Comprehensive University System
EUTW university alliance
List of universities in Taiwan

References

External links

Official NCHU website

 
1919 establishments in Taiwan
Educational institutions established in 1919
Universities and colleges in Taiwan
Universities and colleges in Taichung
Comprehensive universities in Taiwan